In underwater diving, open water is unrestricted water such as a sea, lake or flooded quarries. It is the opposite of confined water (usually a swimming pool) where diver training takes place. Open water also means the diver has direct vertical access to the surface of the water in contact with the Earth's atmosphere.Open water diving implies that if a problem arises, the diver can directly ascend vertically to the atmosphere to breathe air. Penetration diving—involving entering caves or wrecks, or diving under ice—is therefore not "open water diving". In some contexts the lack of a decompression obligation is considered a necessary condition for classification of a dive as an open water dive, but this does not affect the classification of the venue as open water. 

Swim-throughs – the recreational diving term for arches and short, clear, tunnels where the light can be seen at the far end, are technically an overhead environment, but this is often overlooked by divers as there is no risk of getting lost inside, and the risk of entrapment is generally low.

Divers progress from learning diving skills in confined water such as a swimming pool to practicing skills in open water in which the environment is not restricted to a small, controlled locality and depth, with conditions more typical of a natural body of water which might be used by divers, and the range of hazards and associated risk is significantly expanded. In this context confined water is a special case of open water, as it complies with the more general condition of unobstructed access to the surface.

Some recreational diver certification agencies use a variation on this term in the title of their entry level certification. Open Water Diver certification implies that the diver is competent to dive in unrestricted water, with various constraints regarding the conditions, and particularly that their competence is limited to diving in open water with free access to the surface.

Open ocean diving 
The extreme case of open water is the deep open ocean, where the bottom is at a depth which is irrelevant to the diver as there would be no chance of surviving long enough to reach it. Open oceanic water is often remarkably clear, but this is not always the case. There is no natural visual reference for depth in the open ocean, and depth monitoring is critically important to diver safety.

Blue-water diving 

Blue-water diving is done in mid-water where the bottom is out of sight of the diver and there may be no fixed visual reference. It is used by scientific divers for direct observation and sampling of pelagic organisms and particulate matter, particularly the gelatinous zoo-plankton that are fragile and transparent, making them relatively inaccessible by other methods, and by recreational divers for observation and photography of a range of organisms not easily seen in inshore waters.

The techniques of blue-water diving have been developed over the years to suit the conditions and address the hazards of an environment which is functionally bottomless, and has no fixed visible positional references. The diver who is focused on small organisms or instruments at close range is likely to have diminished awareness of depth, buoyancy, current, surge, other divers, large organisms, and even the direction to the surface. 

An accepted procedure for scientific blue-water collection diving with several working divers, is to tether the working divers to a central hub connected to a surface platform, and to have an in-water safety diver attend the hub. The tethers pass through fairleads at the hub and are tensioned by a weight at the end, which keeps slack out of the line and thereby reduces the risk of entanglement, and prevents the end of the line from passing through the fairlead. The tether serves to limit the distance a diver can  move away from the hub, which is typically fastened to a substantial downline supported by a large buoy at the surface, and kept vertical by a weight. The float at the surface allows the divers to move freely in the water column within the constraint of the tether, and drift with the current. The tethers also allow rope signals between the safety diver and the working divers. The surface platform, generally a small boat, may be tethered to the buoy, and if there is sufficient wind to make this a problem a parachute sea anchor can be deployed to minimise drift. Windage will generally position the buoy and boat downwind of the parachute. The other end of the tether is clipped to the diver's harness or buoyancy compensator by some form of quick-release shackle. These procedures and equipment can also be used at night.

If a sea anchor is deployed to limit drift, it must be kept clear of the divers to minimise the risk of entanglement, and it should be buoyed to prevent sinking in a calm. The sea anchor cable should be buoyant line for the same reason. Blue-water diving operations are constrained by water and weather conditions, including wind, sea state, current strength, visibility, and the presence of aggressive predators.

Black-water diving and blackwater photography
Black-water diving is mid-water diving at night, particularly on a moonless night. The term may also be used to refer to diving in zero visibility, or in sewage. Christopher Newbert, author of Within a Rainbow Sea, (1984) is credited as an early black-water diver. Black-water diving is often done as a photographic opportunity for recreational divers as there can be a wide range of plankton that would not often be seen by day or closer inshore. This is known as blackwater photography.

Weighted downlines are commonly used to provide a stable vertical reference. These may be tied to the boat or supported by a buoy.  Each diver may be attached to a downline using a shorter tether to ensure that divers do not go too far from the boat or too deep. The downline may be marked with lights to indicate depth and to attract mobile organisms. A wide range of animal life may be seen, including many species that spend the daylight hours at depths below those accessible to ambient pressure divers, and migrate vertically through the water column on a diurnal cycle. Many of these are bioluminescent or translucent or both.

The boat moves differently from the divers and the divers move differently from the plankton, making it necessary to work to get a position from which there will be enough time to frame and take photos of the drifting subjects. The boat will drift under the influence of current and wind, while the divers and plankton will drift with the current. If there is wind the boat will drag the downlines, and if tethered to the buoy, it will drag the buoy and divers attached. If divers swim ahead of the towing action, they will have a short time to drift with the plankton and take photos until the slack in the line has been taken up, at which point the plankton will be left behind. This drift problem can be reduced by setting a parachute anchor, which will reduce wind drift to a negligible amount. The divers should stay clear of the entanglement hazard of the suspension lines.

References

Underwater diving procedures